Euphorbia hedyotoides is a species of plant in the family Euphorbiaceae. It is endemic to Madagascar.  Its natural habitat is subtropical or tropical dry forests. It is threatened by habitat loss.

Euphorbia hedyotoides is dioecious, with male and female flowers on separate plants.

References

Endemic flora of Madagascar
Endangered plants
hedyotoides
Taxonomy articles created by Polbot
Dioecious plants
Taxa named by N. E. Brown